Napp is a small fishing village in Flakstad Municipality in Nordland county, Norway. The village is located on the northern part of the island of Flakstadøya in the Lofoten archipelago.  The village lies along the European route E10 highway, just west of the Nappstraum Tunnel which connects it to the neighboring island of Vestvågøya.  In 2015, the village had a population of 208 people.

References

Flakstad
Villages in Nordland